The Toro Rosso STR6 is a Formula One racing car developed by Scuderia Toro Rosso for the 2011 Formula One season. It is the second car that the team has built entirely on their own following the introduction of regulations that banned the use of "customer chassis", a chassis developed by one team and purchased by another (prior to 2010 Toro Rosso used a customer chassis from its "big brother" Red Bull Racing). Toro Rosso STR6 was also the first-ever Faenza-based Formula One car to utilize Pirelli tyres since 1990 Minardi M190.

In 2011, the car was driven by Sébastien Buemi and Jaime Alguersuari, with test driver Daniel Ricciardo being guaranteed the opportunity to drive the car in the first practice session of a race weekend at all twenty races in the season (Ricciardo was signed by Hispania Racing as a replacement for Narain Karthikeyan from Round 9 of the championship in Great Britain). The car was unveiled on 1 February at the Circuit Ricardo Tormo in Valencia, Spain.

The Toro Rosso STR6 was powered by the Type 056 engine from Ferrari, the same engine that powered the works Ferraris but Toro Rosso STR6 was opted 2010-spec Ferrari 056 engine due to cheap price reasons. Alguersuari recorded the cars highest qualifying position with 6th at the Belgian Grand Prix and he also recorded the cars best finish with a pair of 7th places at the Italian and Korean Grands Prix. Buemi and Alguersuari combined to score 41 points in 2011 giving the team 8th in the Constructors Championship. Buemi scored 15 of the points to finish the Drivers' Championship in 15th place while Alguersuari scored 26 to finish 14th.

Complete Formula One results
(key) (results in bold indicate pole position; results in italics indicate fastest lap)

References

External links

Toro Rosso STR6